Ramalina stoffersii is a species of lichen in the family Ramalinaceae. Known from the Lesser Antillean islands of Saba and St. Maarten/St. Martin and from Puerto Rico, it was described as new to science in 2011.

References

Lichen species
Lichens described in 2011
Lichens of the Caribbean
stoffersii
Taxa named by Harrie Sipman